Two Captains is a 1955 Soviet adventure film directed by Vladimir Vengerov, based on a novel by Veniamin Kaverin.

Plot 
Alexander Grigoriev dreams of becoming a polar pilot and finding traces of the Arctic expedition of Captain Tatarinov, which has disappeared, and he persistently goes to his goal.

Cast
 Aleksandr Mikhaylov as Sanya Grigoryev
 Olga Zabotkina as Katya Tatarinova
 Anatoly Adoskin 	as Valya Zhukov
 Yevgeni Lebedev as Romashov  
 Borya Belyayev as Sanya Grigoryev in  childhood
 Bruno Freindlich as Ivan Pavlovich Korablyov
 Nina Drobysheva as Sasha, Sanya's sister
 Boris Arakelov as Romashov in  childhood
 Lyudmila Makarova as Katya's girlfriend
 Lidiya Fedoseyeva-Shukshina as  Valya Zhukov's assistant

Release 
Vladimir Vengerov's film  watched 32 million viewers, which is 306 results in the history of Soviet film distribution.

References

External links 
 

1955 films
1950s Russian-language films
Soviet adventure films
Lenfilm films
Russian children's adventure films
1950s children's adventure films
Films based on Russian novels
Soviet children's films